Romania started pursuing nuclear technology, according to some scholars, as early as 1967. In the 1980s, during the long rule of Nicolae Ceauşescu, Romania had a secret program intended to develop nuclear weapons, violating its word on the Treaty on the Non-Proliferation of Nuclear Weapons of 1970. The program ended after the Romanian Revolution of 1989. Romania is considered free of weapons of mass destruction, using nuclear power only for civilian purposes.

Nuclear program
Romania (as the Romanian People's Republic) started a nuclear research program in 1949, focusing on radioactive isotopes in medicine and industry. Some have interpreted Romania's actions to have a dual purpose, as the military program began in 1978, jointly operated with the program for the first power plant. The WMD research program (meaning Danube Program) was conducted at the Nuclear Research Institute in Măgurele, under the strict supervision of the Securitate.

According to Mihai Bălănescu, the former director of the research institute, the program had three departments: one worked on nuclear weapons, one on medium-range missiles, and a third on chemical and biological weapons.

The defection of Securitate general Ion Mihai Pacepa in 1978 was, according to Lucia Hossu Longin, at least in part related to the order given to him by Ceaușescu, to obtain the technology for a certain element needed in the development of nuclear weapons.

In July 1989, Hungarian Foreign Minister Gyula Horn accused Romania of posing military threats to Hungary through its nuclear and medium-range missile programs. Horn claimed that high-level Romanian officials announced that Romania was capable of building such weapons, but the Romanian Government denied those claims.

Other scholars have claimed that Romania was pursuing nuclear technology as a hedge, such that it could muster a weapon should the need arise.

Anti-nuclear rallies
Despite this secret program, Ceaușescu's government organized massive rallies against nuclear proliferation. At one such rally in December 1981, he addressed a crowd of 300,000, arguing that both the East and West should "stop those who are preparing atomic war." He also urged the US and USSR to end the arms race which had led to the placement of medium-range missiles in Europe, saying that only by stopping this race could "humanity ... be saved from a catastrophe".

In 1989, Ceaușescu claimed that Romania had the technology to build nuclear weapons, but that he remained "firmly resolved to fight against nuclear weapons".

Deals with other countries
Romania was involved in negotiations with multiple states on the open market of nuclear technology and materials.

After 1989, it was revealed that in 1986, the Ceaușescu Government improperly diverted a supply of 14 tonnes of heavy water to India. Heavy water is an important ingredient in the creation of nuclear weapons, and the shipment to India was another violation of the Nuclear Non-Proliferation Treaty. "In addition to playing Britain and France off against each other in the mid-1960s, Romania negotiated for nuclear power plants with Canada, Italy, Sweden, the United States, and West Germany." It engaged in negotiations with France and the US, pitting one against the other to obtain better nuclear technology and less strict conditions, as they did with other countries.

After the 1989 revolution
After the 1989 Romanian Revolution, Romania announced to the International Atomic Energy Agency (IAEA) that it had 100mg of plutonium separated in 1985 at the Piteşti Nuclear Research Institute. It allowed the IAEA full access to its facilities for inspection and monitoring. According to a 1992 article in Nucleonics Week, the plutonium was made using a TRIGA research reactor, given to Romania by the United States in the 1970s.

In 2003, Romania handed over to the IAEA 15kg of highly enriched uranium fuel for the research reactor.

See also
 Radu (weapon)

References

External links 
How to Become a Customer: Lessons from the Nuclear Negotiations between the U.S., Canada, and Romania in the 1960s
 Ceauşescu şi programul nuclear al României

 Weapons of mass destruction by country
 Military of Romania
 Science and technology in Romania